John Herbert Crangle Fegan FRCS (17 May 1868 – 26 July 1949) was an English rugby union wing who played club rugby for Blackheath and international rugby for England. Fegan was an all-round sportsman, playing cricket for Blackheath and was a member of the Eagle Lawn Tennis Club at St John's College.

Personal history
Fegan was born in Old Charlton, Kent to Richard Fegan, a physician from Blackheath, and Annie Sarah Pease. He was educated at Blackheath Proprietary School before matriculating to St John's College, Cambridge in 1888. On leaving Cambridge he entered the medical profession and became a surgeon. He married Mollie Barrington MacKinnon in 1898 and they had four children. With the outbreak of the First World War, he joined the British Army and served in the Royal Army Medical Corps. He died in Hemel Hempstead in 1949.

Bibliography

References

1872 births
1949 deaths
Alumni of St John's College, Cambridge
Barbarian F.C. players
Blackheath F.C. players
British Army personnel of World War I
England international rugby union players
English rugby union players
English surgeons
Royal Army Medical Corps officers
Rugby union players from Charlton, London
Rugby union wings
Kent County RFU players